Con Murphy may refer to:
Con Murphy (Valley Rovers hurler) (1922–2007), Irish hurler for Cork, later GAA President
Con Murphy (Bride Rovers hurler), Irish hurler for Cork and Dublin 
Con Murphy (baseball) (1863–1914), American Major League Baseball pitcher
Con Murphy (rugby) (1908–1964), Welsh dual-code international rugby union and rugby league footballer
Con Murphy (RTÉ) (born 1966), Irish sports presenter